Mongolian National Progress Party, also translated as Mongolian National Progressive Party and shortened as MNPP (in Mongolian Монголын Үндэсний Дэвшилтэт Нам, shortened as MYДH), was a Mongolian political party established in 1990.   Davaadorjiin Ganbold was elected as the first Chairman of the party. The party later merged with Mongolian Democratic Party (1990) to establish the Mongolian National Democratic Party in 1992, which later become one of the founding parties of the current Democratic Party of Mongolia (in Mongolian Ардчилсан нам or Ardchilsan Nam).

See also 
 Politics of Mongolia
 List of political parties in Mongolia

References 

Defunct political parties in Mongolia
Political parties established in 1990
1990 establishments in Mongolia
1992 disestablishments in Mongolia